LSQ may refer to:
 Les Stewart Quartet, a predecessor of the band The Quarrymen
 Load-Store Queue, a structure used by some computer CPUs' memory disambiguation mechanisms 
 Agua Santa Airport (IATA airport code: LSQ), Los Ángeles, Chile
 Quebec Sign Language, a sign language used in Canada
 Lone Scout Quill, a grade of scouting of the Lone Scouts of America
 Least squares, a technique of equation fitting